A penumbral lunar eclipse took place on Saturday, August 5, 1933.

Visibility

Related lunar eclipses

Tritos series
 Followed: Lunar eclipse of March 23, 1951

Tzolkinex
 Preceded: Lunar eclipse of June 25, 1926

See also
List of lunar eclipses
List of 20th-century lunar eclipses

Notes

External links

1933-08
1933 in science